Ecclesiastes 10 is the tenth chapter of the Book of Ecclesiastes in the Hebrew Bible or the Old Testament of the Christian Bible. The book contains philosophical speeches by a character called '(the) Qoheleth' ("the Teacher"), composed probably between the 5th and 2nd centuries BCE. Peshitta, Targum, and Talmud attribute the authorship of the book to King Solomon. This chapter focuses on foolishness in persons, in high places, in action, in words and even in national life.

Text
The original text was written in Hebrew. This chapter is divided into 20 verses.

Textual witnesses
Some early manuscripts containing the text of this chapter in Hebrew are of the Masoretic Text, which includes Codex Leningradensis (1008).

There is also a translation into Koine Greek known as the Septuagint, made in the last few centuries BCE. Extant ancient manuscripts of the Septuagint version include Codex Vaticanus (B; B; 4th century), Codex Sinaiticus (S; BHK: S; 4th century), and Codex Alexandrinus (A; A; 5th century). The Greek text is probably derived from the work of Aquila of Sinope or his followers.

Foolishness in personal life (10:1–3)
This section speaks of foolishness in the invisible side of one's life, contrasted to face (cf. : "a sad countenance"), hands (Ecclesiastes 7:26: "[a woman's] hands are fetters") or body (cf. : "put away evil from your flesh"). In verse 1 Qoheleth observes the impact of "a little folly" on one otherwise respected for "a great weight of wisdom".

Foolishness in high places (10:4–7)
Folly can be found within the leadership of a nation (verse 5) and results in odd reversals of position and prestige, in a society which Stuart Weeks describes as "topsy-turvy".

Verse 4
If a ruler’s anger rises against you, do not leave your post; calmness can lay great offenses to rest.
For "calmness", the New King James Version notes that "healing" or "health" translate the Hebrew more literally. Weeks notes that this verse "probably commends 'soothing' rather than
'calmness'".

Foolishness in action (10:8–11)
Michael Eaton summarises this section as "vindictiveness has its built-in penalties", and "slackness may nullify inherent skill". Precautionary measures using wisdom can avert accidents, but are of no use when it is too late (as with snakes that were not charmed before).

Verse 9
He who quarries stones may be hurt by them,
And he who splits wood may be endangered by it.
People who quarry stones or who split logs of wood are vulnerable to occupational hazards.

Foolishness in words (10:12–15)
Spoken words can be a test of wisdom, as the ones from the wise can be helpful, but the foolish ones originate from the foolishness of the heart.

Foolishness in national life (10:16–20)
Qoheleth contrasts the way of disaster (verse 16) and the way of safety (verse 17) in national level. Eating and drinking early on a day indicate self-centered indulgence. Qoheleth does not despise laughter, wine or money, but the point is that "the pleasures of life should not be its total outlook" (verse 19), and one needs "to take life day by day from the hand of God".

See also
 Related Bible parts: Ecclesiastes 2, 3

Notes

References

Sources

External links

 Jewish translations:
 Kohelet – Ecclesiastes - Chapter 10 (Judaica Press) translation [with Rashi's commentary] at Chabad.org
 Christian translations:
 Online Bible at GospelHall.org (ESV, KJV, Darby, American Standard Version, Bible in Basic English)
 Ecclesiastes Chapter 10 King James Version
  Various versions

10